Probus, Tregony and Grampound was an electoral division of Cornwall in the United Kingdom which returned one member to sit on Cornwall Council between 2013 and 2021. It was abolished at the 2021 local elections, being succeeded by Probus and St Erme and St Goran, Tregony and the Roseland.

Councillors

Extent
Probus, Tregony and Grampound represented the villages of Probus, Grampound and Tregony, and the hamlets of Reskivers, Creed and Freewater. The hamlet of Hewas Water was shared with the St Mewan division. The division covered 5,636 hectares in total.

Election results

2017 election

2013 election

References

Electoral divisions of Cornwall Council